Berkes is a surname which may refer to:

 Eckart Berkes (1949–2014), German hurdler
 Enikő Berkes, Hungarian ice dancer
 Ferenc Berkes (born 1985), Hungarian chess grandmaster
 Kálmán Berkes (born 1952), Hungarian clarinetist
 Milton Berkes (1924-2015), American politician
 Niyazi Berkes (1908–1988), Turkish Cypriot sociologist
 Zoltán Berkes (canoeist), Hungarian sprint canoer who competed in the late 1980s
 Zoltán Berkes (field hockey) (1916–?), Hungarian field hockey player

See also
Robert Berks (1922-2011), American sculptor, industrial designer and planner
Burkes, surname

Hungarian-language surnames